The Devil's Playground is a 1976 Australian drama film written, produced and directed by Fred Schepisi. It is a semi-autobiographical film which tells the story of a boy growing up and going to school in a Catholic juniorate administered by De La Salle Brothers. Its focus is on the trials of the flesh and the tensions that arise, for both Brothers and students, from the religious injunction to control one's sexuality.

Premise
In August 1953, the 13-year-old Tom Allen attends a Catholic juniorate in Melbourne, Australia. Students and Brothers face individual challenges of faith and self-restraint.

Cast
 Arthur Dignam as Brother Francine
 Nick Tate as Brother Victor
 Simon Burke as Tom Allen
 Charles McCallum as Brother Sebastian
 John Frawley as Brother Celian
 Jonathan Hardy as Brother Arnold
 Gerry Duggan as Father Hanrahan
 Peter Cox as Brother James
 Thomas Keneally as Father Marshall
 Sheila Florance as Mrs Sullivan
 John Diedrich as Fitz
 Alan Cinis as Waite
 Richard Morgan as Smith
 Jeremy Kewley as Thompson

Production
The screenplay was based on Schepisi's own experience attending a Catholic juniorate and took him five years to write. The film financing took three years to arrange, eventually coming from the Australian Film Commission ($100,000) and the Film House, Schepisi's own company ($154,000), with the balance coming from private investment.

It was shot in 1975 mostly at Werribee Park near Melbourne.

Recognition
The film won the 1976 Australian Film Institute Award for Best Film, Best Direction, Best Lead Actor for both Simon Burke and Nick Tate, Best Screenplay, Best Achievement in Cinematography, and the Jury Prize.

Box office
The Devil's Playground grossed $334,000 at the box office in Australia, which is equivalent to $2,157,500 in 2020 dollars. According to Schepisi, the movie almost got its money back.

Home media
The Devil's Playground was released on DVD with a new print by Umbrella Entertainment in November 2008. The DVD is compatible with all region codes and includes special features such as the theatrical trailer, an interview with Fred Schepisi, and audio commentary with Fred Schepisi. This film was released on Blu-ray by Umbrella Entertainment in June 2014, with extras.

See also
 Cinema of Australia
 Devil's Playground (TV series)

References

External links
 
The Devil's Playground at Oz Movies
 The Devil's Playground at the National Film and Sound Archive

1976 films
1970s biographical drama films
1970s English-language films
Australian biographical drama films
Films directed by Fred Schepisi
Films scored by Bruce Smeaton
Films about Catholicism
Films set in Melbourne
1976 directorial debut films
1976 drama films
Films about puberty
Films set in 1953
1970s coming-of-age drama films